Modno is a rural locality (a selo) in Modenskoye Rural Settlement, Ustyuzhensky District, Vologda Oblast, Russia. The population was 19 as of 2002. There are 4 streets.

Geography 
Plotichye is the nearest rural locality.

References 

Rural localities in Ustyuzhensky District